Mohammad Al-Malki (Arabic:محمد المالكي) (born 6 December 1990) is a Qatari footballer. He currently plays for Umm Salal.

External links

References

Qatari footballers
1990 births
Living people
Al Ahli SC (Doha) players
Umm Salal SC players
Qatar Stars League players
Qatari Second Division players
Association football midfielders